The following is a list of convicted Romanian politicians.

Presidents 
 Nicolae Ceaușescu, convicted by a special military tribunal on charges of genocide and sabotage of the Romanian economy and sentenced to death

Prime ministers 
 Constantin Dăscălescu, sentenced in 1990 to life imprisonment for manslaughter
 Adrian Năstase, convicted in 2012 for two years in prison for misuse of a publicly funded conference to raise cash for his unsuccessful campaign in 2004. Convicted in 2014 for four years in prison for taking bribes and a three-year prison sentence for blackmail.

Ministers 
 Ion Dincă, Deputy Prime Minister (1980  1989), sentenced in February 1990 to life imprisonment and confiscation of all property
 Emil Bobu, Minister of Interior (1973  1975), Labor Minister (1979  1981), was found guilty of complicity in genocide for his role in issuing orders to fire during the Romanian Revolution of 1989 and received a term of life imprisonment and confiscation of all his personal property
 Decebal Traian Remeș, Minister of Agriculture, and Rural Development (4 April 2007  11 October 2007), sentenced in 2012 to three years' imprisonment for bribery.
 Victor Babiuc, Minister of Defense (1996  2000), was sentenced in 2013 to 2 years in prison for a land swap through which the Romanian state lost almost $1 million.
 George Copos, Deputy Prime-Minister (December 2004  January 2006), was sentenced in 2014 to 4 years imprisonment for tax evasion of around $1 million that was linked to the sale of several retail spaces from his company, Ana Electronics, to the Romanian National Lottery.
 Tudor Chiuariu, Minister of Justice (5 April 2007  10 December 2007) and Zsolt Nagy, Minister of Communications (2004  2007), received in 2014 for corruption a 3½ and a four-year suspended sentence, respectively.
 Relu Fenechiu, Minister of Transportation (2012  2013), was sentenced in 2014 to 5 years imprisonment. Fenechiu sold a number of old electrical transformers to Electrica Moldova at a highly inflated price of 2.8 million €.
 Monica Iacob Ridzi, Minister of Youth and Sport (2008  2009), was sentenced in 2014 to five years in prison for embezzling money that was spent by the Ministry on the Youth Day festivities.
 Gabriel Sandu, Minister of Communications (2008  2010), was sentenced in 2016 to 3 years imprisonment (before the appeal to 2 years imprisonment) for bribery and money laundering, and to an asset forfeiture of over €2 million in the Microsoft licensing corruption scandal.
 Codruț Șereș, Minister of Economy and Commerce (2004  2006), was sentenced in 2016 to 4 years imprisonment for embezzlement of funds belonging to the Hidroelectrica company.
 Dan Șova, minister in several Ponta cabinets, was sentenced  in 2018 to 3 years imprisonment and €100,000 forfeiture for influence peddling.
 Elena Udrea, Minister of Regional Development and Tourism (2009  2012), was sentenced in 2018 to 6 years imprisonment for bribery and abuse of power in the "Bute Gala" case.

Senators 
 Corneliu Coposu, convicted in 1956 for "betrayal of the working class" and "crime against social reforms" and sentenced to life imprisonment
  Vasile Duță, sentenced in 2010  to 5 years imprisonment for influence peddling
 Cătălin Voicu,  sentenced in 2012 to 7 years imprisonment for bribery
 Dan Voiculescu, sentenced in 2014 to 10 years in prison for using his political influence in the privatization of the Food Research Institute which had an estimated value of €7.7 million, but was instead bought by his company, Grivco at an undervalued price of €100,000 According to the prosecutors, the damages brought to the Romanian state amounted to over €60 million.
 , convicted in 2015 for using false documents to contract financing of €900,000 from European funds that should have been used to revamp four schools. Nicolescu was also convicted for having taken a €60,000 bribe from businessman Cornel Penescu and sentenced to 7 years in prison. Also sentenced in 2017 to 8 years in prison for bribery, sentence subject to appeal.
 , sentenced in 2016 to 3 years imprisonment for influence-peddling

Deputies 
 Liviu Dragnea, President of the Chamber of Deputies starting December 2016 and former Minister of Administration and Regional Development (2012-2015), convicted in a case involving electoral fraud, for which he received a two-year suspended sentence in April 2016. Dragnea was later sentenced to 3½ years in prison, in May 2019 after being found guilty of corruption.

Notes 

 
Convicted of crimes